Adriano Bonaiuti (born 7 May 1967) is an Italian professional football coach and a former player who played as a goalkeeper. He is the current goalkeeping coach of Inter Milan.

Career
A youth product of Cesena, he started his career with minor league club Sambenedettese before to become Stefano Tacconi's backup at Juventus. In 1991, he joined Padova, where he spent five years as a regular, being protagonist to the club's rise into the top flight. From 1996 to 1998 he played for Palermo, successively moving to another Western Sicilian club, Trapani. In 2000, after a short stint at Pescara, he joined Udinese as third-choice keeper, retiring from football in 2005.

He served as goalkeeping coach of Udinese from 2004 to 2005 (while still active as a player), then moving back to his native Rome to fill in the same position under head coach Luciano Spalletti (from 2005 to 2009).

Honours
Juventus
 UEFA Cup winner: 1989–90.
 Coppa Italia winner: 1989–90.

External links
Profile at Lega-Calcio.it
 Profile at Playerhistory.com

1967 births
Living people
Italian footballers
Serie A players
Serie B players
A.S. Sambenedettese players
Trapani Calcio players
Juventus F.C. players
Calcio Padova players
Palermo F.C. players
Cosenza Calcio 1914 players
Delfino Pescara 1936 players
Udinese Calcio players
Association football goalkeepers
UEFA Cup winning players
A.S. Roma non-playing staff
Inter Milan non-playing staff